Leesi is a monotypic moth genus in the family Pterophoridae described by Christian Gibeaux in 1996. Its only species, Leesi masoala, described by the same author in the same year, is known from Madagascar.

References

Platyptiliini
Moths of Madagascar
Moths of Africa
Moths described in 1996